鄭家純 may refer to:
Henry Cheng, Hong Kong businessman
Ili Cheng, Taiwanese model